{{Automatic taxobox
| image =
| image_caption =
| taxon = Heppsora
| authority = D.D. Awasthi & Kr.P. Singh
| type_species = Heppsora indica
| type_species_authority = D.D. Awasthi & Kr.P. Singh
| subdivision_ranks = Species
| subdivision = H. bullata
H. indica 
}}Heppsora is a genus of lichenized fungi in the family Ramalinaceae.

The genus name of Heppsora'' is in honour of Johann Adam Philipp Hepp (1797–1867), a German physician and lichenologist.

The genus was circumscribed by Dharani Dhar Awasthi and Krishna Pal Singh in Bryologist vol.80 on page 537 in 1977.

References

Ramalinaceae
Lichen genera
Lecanorales genera